The Calamuchita Department is a subdivision (department) of the province of Córdoba, Argentina.

The department is located in the center-west of the province and includes important tourist destinations, especially along the Calamuchita Valley. The center of this region is the city of  Embalse home of one of the two functional nuclear power plants in Argentina (see Embalse nuclear power plant).

Settlements

Amboy
Calmayo
Cañada del Sauce
Embalse
La Cruz
Las Bajadas
Las Caleras
Los Cóndores
Los Molinos
Los Reartes
Lutti
Río de Los Sauces
San Agustín
San Ignacio
Santa Rosa de Calamuchita
Segunda Usina
Villa Amancay
Villa Ciudad Parque Los Reartes
Villa del Dique
Villa General Belgrano
Villa Quillinzo
Villa Rumipal
Villa Yacanto

References
 

Departments of Córdoba Province, Argentina